The year 2011 is the fourth and last year in the history of Shark Fights, a mixed martial arts promotion based in the United States. In 2011 Shark Fights held 6 events beginning with, Shark Fights 14: Horwich vs. Villefort.

Events list

Shark Fights 14: Horwich vs. Villefort

Shark Fights 14: Horwich vs. Villefort was an event held on March 11, 2011 at the Fair Park Coliseum in Lubbock, Texas.

Results

Shark Fights 15: Villaseñor vs Camozzi

Shark Fights 15: Villaseñor vs Camozzi was an event held on May 27, 2011 at the Santa Ana Star Center in Rio Rancho, New Mexico.

Results

Shark Fights 16: Neer vs. Juarez

Shark Fights 16: Neer vs. Juarez was an event held on June 25, 2011 at the Ector County Coliseum in Odessa, Texas.

Results

Shark Fights 17: Horwich vs. Rosholt 2

Shark Fights 17: Horwich vs. Rosholt 2 was an event held on July 15, 2011 at the Dr Pepper Arena in Frisco, Texas.

Results

Shark Fights 18

Shark Fights 18 was an event held on August 19, 2011 at John Ascuaga's Nugget Casino Resort in Sparks, Nevada.

Results

Shark Fights 19

Shark Fights 19 was an event held on September 10, 2011 at the Independence Events Center in Independence, Missouri.

Results

Shark Fights 20

Shark Fights 20 was an event held on October 15, 2011 at the Edgewater Casino Resort in Laughlin, Nevada.

Results

Shark Fights 21: Lashley vs. Knothe 

Shark Fights 21: Lashley vs. Knothe was an event held on November 11, 2011 at the Fair Park Coliseum in Lubbock, Texas.

Results

References

Shark Fights events
2011 in mixed martial arts